Sushma Raj is an Indian actress who has worked in the Tamil, Telugu and Kannada film industries.

Career
Sushma Raj is settled in Bangalore and pursued a degree in fashion designing, before becoming an actress. Sushma made her acting debut with the Kannada romantic film, Madarangi (2013), in which she won positive reviews for her portrayal of her character. The film had a low-key release but became a sleeper hit at the box office and fetched further offers for the actress. Her breakthrough role was in the Telugu romantic thriller film, Maaya  (2014) by G. Neelakanta Reddy, for which she auditioned and participated on workshops for, before beginning shoot. A critic noted Sushma "pulls off her role rather comfortably and manages to show the variations in her character without strain" and that "she is sincere and plays her part naturally". She was subsequently seen

in Joru opposite Sundeep Kishan, though the film fared poorly at the box office.

Sushma next appeared in the Tamil romantic comedy, India Pakistan (2015) opposite Vijay Antony and won positive reviews for her portrayal of a lawyer. A critic from Sify.com noted Sushma "emotes well and is perfect for the role" and linked her appearance to Anushka Shetty.

Filmography
Films

References

Living people
Actresses in Tamil cinema
Actresses from Bangalore
21st-century Indian actresses
Indian film actresses
Actresses in Telugu cinema
Actresses in Kannada cinema
Year of birth missing (living people)